Zeuxine strateumatica, common names lawn orchid or soldier orchid, is a species of terrestrial orchids. It is widespread across much of Asia, including China, Japan, Turkey, Uzbekistan, Iran, the Indian Subcontinent, Afghanistan, and Southeast Asia, as well as in New Guinea and in some of the islands of the Pacific. It is naturalized in Saudi Arabia, Brazil, Tamaulipas (in northeastern Mexico), West Indies, Hawaii, California, and the southeastern United States from Texas to Georgia.

Zeuxine strateumatica is a perennial herb up to 25 cm tall. Leaves are linear or narrowly lanceolate, up to 9 cm long. Flowers are borne in an erect panicle of as many as 50 flowers, each white with a yellow lip.

In its natural habitat in Asia, Zeuxine strateumatica grows in grasslands, and along streambanks. In places where it is introduced, it frequently grows in lawns and agricultural fields, and is thus considered a nuisance weed.

References

External links

Atlas of Florida Vascular Plants
Dave's Garden
Medicinal Plants of Bangladesh, Zeuxine strateumatica
[https://dergipark.org.tr/en/download/article-file/1632826 Türkiye	Florası	İçin	Yeni	Bir	Bitki	Türü	Kayıdı:
Zeuxine	strateumatica (L.)	Schltr.	(Orchidaceae), Zeuxine strateumatica]

strateumatica
Orchids of Asia
Orchids of Oceania
Orchids of Malaya
Orchids of Bangladesh
Orchids of Myanmar
Orchids of China
Orchids of India
Orchids of Indonesia
Orchids of Japan
Orchids of Laos
Orchids of Malaysia
Orchids of New Guinea
Orchids of Papua New Guinea
Orchids of the Philippines
Orchids of Sri Lanka
Orchids of Singapore
Orchids of Thailand
Orchids of Vietnam
Plants described in 1753
Taxa named by Carl Linnaeus
Medicinal plants of Asia